Xifeng District is a district and the seat of the city of Qingyang in Gansu Province, China.

Inhabited since at least 200,000 years ago, it first became an important town in the Ming dynasty, due to its location on the route from Chang'an (Xi'an) to Ningxia.

In 1985, Xifeng was upgraded to a city in Qingyang Prefecture.
In 2002, Qingyang Prefecture was upgraded to a prefecture-level city, and Xifeng City (county-level) became its district.

Economy 
Xifeng is known as the grain shed of eastern Gansu, but is also known for its fruit orchards.

The Xifeng oilfield located in the district is one of the largest oilfields of the Ordos Basin. Although oil was presumed to be present under Xifeng since 1907, exploitation didn't start until the 1960s.

Tourism 
Xifeng is home to the Beishiku temple-grottoes, a system of 195 caves built in 509 AD.

Geography 
The district is located centrally on a loess plain named Dongzhiyuan flanked by gullies, at around 1421 m elevation. The plain is considered the world's largest of its kind and estimated to be around 200 m in thickness.

Administrative divisions
Xifeng District is divided into 3 Subdistricts, 5 towns, and 2 townships.
Subdistricts
 Beijie Banshichu Subdistrict
 Nanjie Banshichu Subdistrict
 Xijie Banshichu Subdistrict

Towns

Townships
 Shishe Township()
 Xiansheng Township()

Transport 

 Qingyang Xifeng Airport
 G22 Qingdao–Lanzhou Expressway
 China National Highway 244
 China National Highway 327
 Qingyang railway station

References

County-level divisions of Gansu
Qingyang